The T-Mobile 4G LTE CellSpot is a femtocell released by T-Mobile US in 2015.

Developments 
In 2016, Qualcomm announced a collaboration with T-Mobile and Nokia for the development of femtocells.

Versions 
The original version and version 2 have been released.

References

External links 
 
 FCC ID: H8NSS2FII
T-Mobile CellSpot Setup Guide

Mobile telecommunications
Telecommunications infrastructure
T-Mobile US